Cohors I Alpinorum may refer to:
 Cohors I Alpinorum equitata
 Cohors I Alpinorum peditata